San Pietro Viminario is a comune (municipality) in the Province of Padua in the Italian region Veneto, located about  southwest of Venice and about  south of Padua.

San Pietro Viminario borders the following municipalities: Cartura, Conselve, Monselice, Pernumia, Tribano.

Demographic evolution

References

Cities and towns in Veneto